Erden Airfield  is an airfield in Montana Province, Bulgaria. The airfield was built in 2006 and is located 5 km south of Boychinovtsi near the village of Erden.

References

External links
 Photos capture on Erden airfield

Airports in Bulgaria